The Bangladesh Premier League (BPL) is a professional Twenty20 cricket tournament organized by the Bangladesh Cricket Board (BCB). As of 19 February 2022, 50 players have captained their team in at least one match.

Notable captains 
Mashrafe Mortaza, the former captain of the Bangladesh national cricket team, has played the most matches as a captain, having led all 86 matches in which he has played. While Mosharraf Hossain, Shoaib Malik and Tom Abell are tied for the best win–loss percentage in the BPL as a captain, each with 100%, all have only captained for at most three matches. Of those who have captained for at least 10 matches, Imrul Kayes has the best win–loss percentage in the BPL, with a win–loss percentage of 71.42% from 28 matches. Mortaza leads in number of matches won as a captain with 54 wins. Of those who have captained at least 10 matches, Mosaddek Hossain has the worst win–loss percentage of 15.38% from 13 matches. Mahmudullah has lost the most matches with 42 losses.

Shakib Al Hasan, Nasir Hossain, Tamim Iqbal, Alok Kapali, Mortaza, Nafees, Mushfiqur Rahim, Mahmudullah, Misbah-ul-Haq, Kayes, Malik, Mohammad Nabi, Mehidy Hasan, Naeem Islam and Mosaddek are the only players who have captained two or more teams. Rahim has captained different teams every season and is the only captain to have led seven teams in BPL which are Duronto Rajshahi, Sylhet Royals, Sylhet Super Stars, Barisal Bulls, Rajshahi Kings, Chittagong Vikings and Khulna Tigers. Peter Trego has captained his team for the most matches without registering a win; he led his team in five matches which resulted in five losses.

Of the 50 players who have played at least one match as a captain, 22 of them are from Bangladesh. Of the 28 others, five each are from England and Sri Lanka, four each are from Australia, Pakistan and West Indies, three from New Zealand and one each from Afghanistan, South Africa and Zimbabwe.

Key

List
The list includes those players who have captained their team in at least one BPL match. The list is initially organised by the number of matches as a captain and if the numbers are tied, the list is sorted by sorted by their last name.

Notes

References

External links
BCB Site

Bangladesh Premier League lists
Bangladesh Premier
Premier